Cameron McGrone (born June 22, 2000) is an American football linebacker for the Indianapolis Colts of the National Football League (NFL). He played college football at Michigan and was drafted by the New England Patriots in the fifth round of the 2021 NFL Draft.

Early years
McGrone attended Lawrence Central High School in Indianapolis, Indiana. As a senior he played in seven games after tearing his ACL the previous year and had 84 tackles and four sacks. McGrone played in the  2018 U.S. Army All-American Game. He committed to the University of Michigan to play college football.

College career
McGrone appeared in one game his first year at Michigan in 2018. As a redshirt freshman in 2019, he entered the season as a backup but became a starter after starter Josh Ross was injured. Overall, he appeared in 13 games with 10 starts and recorded 66 tackles and four sacks.

Statistics

Professional career

New England Patriots
McGrone was drafted by the New England Patriots in the 5th round, 177th overall, of the 2021 NFL Draft. On May 14, he signed his four-year rookie contract. He was placed on the active/non-football injury list at the start of training camp on July 21, 2021. He was placed on the reserve list on August 31, 2021.

On August 30, 2022, McGrone was waived by the Patriots and signed to the practice squad the next day.

Indianapolis Colts
On December 20, 2022, McGrone was signed by the Indianapolis Colts off the Patriots practice squad.

References

External links
Indianapolis Colts bio
Michigan Wolverines bio

2000 births
Living people
Players of American football from Indianapolis
American football linebackers
Michigan Wolverines football players
African-American players of American football
New England Patriots players
21st-century African-American sportspeople
20th-century African-American sportspeople
Indianapolis Colts players